Chuck Hansen (May 13, 1947 - March 26, 2003) was the compiler, over a period of 30 years, of the world's largest private collection of unclassified documents on how America developed atomic and thermonuclear weapons.

Research
Hansen's documents were obtained through the U.S. Freedom of Information Act and since his death have been housed at the National Security Archive at George Washington University.

In 1988, Hansen wrote the book U.S. Nuclear Weapons: The Secret History, which, along with great detail about the process of developing, testing and administering atomic weapons was critical of the U.S. Defense Department, the Atomic Energy Commission, and some other government agencies. In the book Hansen reported that the early years of nuclear testing were less successful than claimed; bombs failed, or yielded smaller or larger explosions than anticipated or announced, and attempts to develop a  radioactivity-free bomb were unsuccessful.  U.S. Nuclear Weapons: The Secret History is currently out of print, but it is available on compact disk through his publisher.

A second compilation of Hansen's material was published on compact disc as Swords of Armageddon in 1995. While Hansen´s U.S. Nuclear Weapons: The Secret History was very instructive, Swords of Armageddon contains much more information and details about nuclear weapons developed by United States. It is in its second revision.

Publications

See also
List of books about nuclear issues
List of nuclear whistleblowers
Nuclear disarmament
Nuclear weapons and the United States
Nevada Test Site
Alvin C. Graves
National Security Archive

References

External links

 The National Security Archive The George Washington University
 
 
 

Historians of nuclear weapons
1947 births
2003 deaths
Nuclear weapons